The Ballantine's Championship (known as The Championship at Laguna National in its final year) was a European Tour golf tournament which was played from 2008 to 2014. It was the first European Tour event to be staged in South Korea.

From 2008 to 2010, the tournament was played at Pinx Golf Club on the island of Jeju. From 2011 to 2013, the tournament was played at Blackstone Golf Club. In 2014, the event has moved to Laguna National Golf & CC in Singapore and titled as The Championship at Laguna National.

The tournament was announced in July 2007 by the European Tour in partnership with the Korean PGA, marking a continuation of the European Tour's expansion into Asia. The Asian Tour, which had not been offered the co-sanctioning rights to which it felt it was entitled, responded by calling the event an "invasive" action that "colonised" Asia in "blatant disregard" of the "principles of the International Federation of PGA Tours", but six months later it agreed terms to co-sanction the event.
The prize fund in the first year was €2 million (circa US$2.9 million).

Winners

See also
Korea Open (golf)
World Classic Championship

Notes

References

External links
Coverage on European Tour's official site
Coverage on Asian Tour's official site

Former Asian Tour events
Former European Tour events
Korean Tour events
Golf tournaments in South Korea
Golf tournaments in Singapore
Recurring sporting events established in 2008
Recurring sporting events disestablished in 2014